Amauroderma ovisporum is a polypore fungus in the family Ganodermataceae. It was described as a new species in 2015 by mycologists Allyne Christina Gomes-Silva, Leif Ryvarden, and Tatiana Gibertoni. The specific epithet ovisporum (from the Latin words ovi = "egg" and spora = "spore") refers to the ovoid shape of the basidiospores. A. ovisporum is found in the states of Pará and Rondônia in the Brazilian Amazon.

References

ovisporum
Fungi described in 2015
Fungi of Brazil
Taxa named by Leif Ryvarden